Kalak-e Sar Bisheh (also Romanized as Kalak-e Sar Bīsheh) is a village in Emamzadeh Jafar Rural District, in the Central District of Gachsaran County, Kohgiluyeh and Boyer-Ahmad Province, Iran. At the 2006 census, its population was 15, in 5 families.

References 

Populated places in Gachsaran County